Qareh Khezer or Qarah Khezer or Qareh Khezr may refer to:
 Qareh Khezer, East Azerbaijan
 Qarah Khezer, West Azerbaijan